Sean D. Logan (born 11 February 1966) is the former director of the Ohio Department of Natural Resources and was a member of the Ohio House of Representatives from 1990 to 2000. His district consisted of a portion of Columbiana County, Ohio. He was succeeded by Chuck Blasdel. Ohio Governor Ted Strickland appointed him as ODNR director in January 2007.

Ohio Department of Natural Resources
Logan was appointed by Governor Ted Strickland to serve as the director of the Department of Natural Resources in 2007. As director, he presided over an era where the department saw funding dry up. By 2011, where Logan is set to leave his post due to Strickland losing reelection, the department had only half the amount appropriated to it as it did a decade ago. Logan was replaced by David Mustine by John Kasich in December 2010.

In 2011 Logan was appointed head of the Muskingum Watershed Conservancy District.

References

External links
Ohio Department of Natural Resources - Director Sean D. Logan
Project Vote Smart page

Republican Party members of the Ohio House of Representatives
Living people
1966 births